Thingan may refer to:

Thingan, Kalewa, Burma
Thingan, Nepal